is a Prefectural Natural Park in Wakayama Prefecture, Japan. Established in 1958, the park is wholly located within the city of Kinokawa. The park's central feature is the eponymous .

See also
 National Parks of Japan
 List of Places of Scenic Beauty of Japan (Wakayama)

References

External links
  Map of Ryūmonzan Prefectural Natural Park

Parks and gardens in Wakayama Prefecture
Kinokawa, Wakayama
Protected areas established in 1958
1958 establishments in Japan